Michel Rasquin (19 September 1899 – 27 April 1958) was a Luxembourgish journalist and socialist politician, and European Commissioner.

Rasquin was born in Pétange, Luxembourg, in 1899. After the Second World War, he was the president of the Luxembourg Socialist Workers' Party from 1945 to 1951.

He was a member of the Council of State, the advisory body, from December 1945 to July 1948. In June 1948, he was elected to the Chamber of Deputies of Luxembourg.

He was Mayor of Esch-sur-Alzette from 1949 to 1951.

From 1951 to 1958, he was a minister in the coalition governments of Pierre Dupong and Joseph Bech, with responsibility for the economy.

He was appointed Luxembourg's representative on the inaugural European Commission, the Hallstein Commission, which took office in January 1958. Rasquin had responsibility for the Transport portfolio, but died in April 1958 and was succeeded by Lambert Schaus.

|-

|-

|-

1899 births
1958 deaths
Luxembourgian European Commissioners
Mayors of Esch-sur-Alzette
Members of the Chamber of Deputies (Luxembourg)
Members of the Council of State of Luxembourg
Luxembourg Socialist Workers' Party politicians
Luxembourgian journalists
Male journalists
People from Pétange
Tageblatt people
20th-century journalists